Ten and a quarter inch gauge (or X scale) is a large modelling scale, generally only used for ridable miniature railways. Model railways at this scale normally confine the scale modelling aspects to the reproduction of the locomotive and with steam locomotives the accompanying tender. Rolling stock is generally made to carry passengers or maintenance equipment and is not to scale. There are also a number of railways which use this gauge of track but are narrow-gauge railways. Examples are Rudyard Lake Steam Railway, Isle of Mull Railway and Wells and Walsingham Light Railway.
An organisation to promote this gauge of railway has been reformed in May 2010 as The Ten and a Quarter Railway Society, which will also cover the larger  and smaller  gauges.

Locomotives
Generally model trains at this scale are individually hand-made, however between 1963 and 1964, Lines Bros Ltd using their combined Tri-ang and Minic brand names produced a commercial system under the name the Tri-ang Minic Narrowgauge Railway, or T.M.N.R.. Commercial companies also build bespoke locomotives or in the case of  the Exmoor Steam Railway a standard design of 2-4-2T.

Rolling stock

Rolling stock was normally supplied in the form of seaside coaches.
However the more growth in narrow-gauge style railways shows that fully enclosed coaches seating two adults side by side are possible and preferable for commercial railways.

See also
 Rail transport modelling scales
 Model railway scales

External links

History of a scale type atlantic locomotive built by David Curwen
Information on standard narrow-gauge style locomotives built by Exmoor Steam Railway
The Ten and a Quarter Railway Society website

 
Miniature railways by size